Kalakada is a village in Annamayya district of the Indian state of Andhra Pradesh. It is the mandal headquarters of Kalakada mandal.papulation (2001)
-Total    34,279
- males	  17,398
- females. 16,881
literacy (2001)
- total	56.08%
- males 	70.12%
-females 	41.64 %

References 

Villages in Annamayya district
Mandal headquarters in Annamayya district